Lyudmyla Kichenok and Nadiia Kichenok were the defending champions, but both players chose not to participate.

The wildcard pairing of Nigina Abduraimova and Barbora Štefková won the title, defeating top seeds Valentyna Ivakhnenko and Lidziya Marozava in the final, 6–4, 1–6, [10–6].

Seeds

Draw

References 
 Draw

Lale Cup - Doubles
Lale Cup